Wollongong United FC is an Australian soccer club based in Wollongong, currently participating in the Illawarra Premier League. The club played in the 1991 season of the National Soccer League under the name Wollongong Macedonia, where it finished last.

History 
Formed in 1976 by the "Macedonian Orthodox Community of Wollongong", the club was originally established on behalf of the Macedonian Australian community of Wollongong. With a huge supporter base, the club was originally known as Wollongong United Soccer Club. Since then it has also been known as Wollongong Macedonia, as represented in the National Soccer League (NSL) 1990.

Upon entering the Premier League in the Illawarra Second division, the club quickly advanced in 1980 to enter the NSW Second division, finishing second at season end on its first attempt.

In 1986, the club reached the top competition in NSW Division 1, today known as NSW National Premier League. Wollongong United F.C completed the season undefeated, to this day, the only club in NSW to do so (Except for Eastern Suburbs Hakoah in 1971 and Croatia Sydney in 1981).
In 1990 the club claim their first title in NSW Division 1 History, This success led the club to the pinnacle of Australian soccer.

Post-NSL
Between 1991 and 2004, the club played in the NSW State League with a strong, consistent representation in both junior and senior ranks.
In 1992, the club rename as Illawarra Lions in NSW Super League and again in 2003 as Wollongong United FC in NSW State League.

In 2004 the club evaluated its position and it was deemed, in the best interests of the club, its members, supporters and sponsors to return to the local Illawarra Football Association. In 2005, the club competed in the IFA First Division with an aim to return to the IFA Premier League. Wollongong United finished second and gained promotion into the Premier League for the 2006 season. Wollongong United has reached two grand finals in the years since (2015 and 2018), winning the competition in 2015. The club remains in the now Football South Coast Illawarra Premier League.

Notable former players 
 Scott Chipperfield – Australian international
 Mile Sterjovski – Australian international
 Zlatko Nastevski – Australian international
 Robbie Shields – Republic of Ireland youth international
 Kazuto Kushida – professional Japanese footballer
 Nathan Elasi – Australian youth international

Honours
 Illawarra Second Division (third tier) Champions - 1977
 Illawarra Second Division (third tier) Premiers - 1977
 NSW 1st Division Champions - 1990
 NSW 1st Division Premiers - 1990
 NSW 2nd Division Premiers - 1985
 Illawarra Premier League Premiers - 2015, 2020
 Bert Bampton Cup - 1978, 2012, 2014, 2015, 2020

External links
Official Website of Wollongong United FC

Association football clubs established in 1976
Soccer clubs in Wollongong
Illawarra Premier League
1976 establishments in Australia
Macedonian sports clubs in Australia